Vietnam is participating at the 2011 Southeast Asian Games which is being held in the cities of Palembang and Jakarta, Indonesia from 11 November 2011 to 22 November 2011.

Competitors

Medals

Medal table

Medals by date

See also
Vietnam at the 2009 Southeast Asian Games
Vietnam at the 2007 Southeast Asian Games
Vietnam at the 2005 Southeast Asian Games

References

External links
 Total Medal by Vietnam

2011
Southeast Asian Games
Nations at the 2011 Southeast Asian Games
Southeast Asian Games